Campana Partido (Spanish: Partido de Campana) is a  partido in the north-east of Buenos Aires Province in Argentina.

Economy
The economy of Campana went through significant decline in the late 20th century, but the town and its partido are going through an economic and cultural resurgence, which is reflected by its recent growth in population.

Attractions
Museo del Automóvil "Manuel Iglesias", display of antique cars, including the oldest car in Argentina.
Museo Ferroviario, museum of the Central Argentino and Mitre railway lines. 
Teatro Municipal "Pedro Barbero", Theatre
Salón de Exposiciones "Ronald Nash", exhibition and conference centre.
Centro Cultural La Rosa, cultural centre and theatre.
Librería El Garage, display of local arts.

Sports
Campana is home to Club Villa Dálmine, a football club that currently plays in Argentina's regionalised 2nd division, and to Puerto Nuevo, an older club that plays in 5th division.

Locations
Campana
Alto Los Cardales
Lomas del Río Luján

External links
 Municipality of Campana
 La Comedia de Campana
 Pollution and Cancer in Campana
 InfoBAN Campana

 
1885 establishments in Argentina
Partidos of Buenos Aires Province